The Olivetti Lettera 22  is a portable mechanical typewriter designed by Marcello Nizzoli in 1949 or, according to the company's current owner Telecom Italia, 1950.  This typewriter was very popular in Italy, and it still has many fans. It was awarded the Compasso d'oro prize in 1954. In 1959 the Illinois Institute of Technology chose the Lettera 22 as the best design product of the last 100 years.

The typewriter is about 27x37x8 cm (with the carriage return lever adding another 1–2 centimeters in height), making it quite portable for the time's standards, even though its  weight may somewhat limit portability.

The model was eventually succeeded by the Olivetti Lettera 32.

Mechanics
The Lettera 22 is an oblique frontstroke typebar typewriter. The typebars strike a red/black inked ribbon, which is positioned between the typebar and the paper by a lever whenever a key is pressed; a small switch located near the upper right side of the keyboard can be used to control the strike position of the ribbon, in order to print with black, red, or no ink (for mimeograph stencils).

Ribbon movement, which also occurs at every keypress, automatically reverses direction when there is no ribbon left on the feed reel; two mechanical sensors, situated next to each wheel, move when the ribbon is put under tension (indicating ribbon end), attaching the appropriate wheel to the ribbon transport mechanism and detaching the other.

The Lettera 22 uses a basket shift or segment shift (that is, the unit including the typebars moves up and down when shifting, as opposed to the carriage shift system). The Lettera 22 is quite compact compared to other 1950s portable typewriters using a basket shift, such as the Smith Corona Sterling or Remington-Rand Quiet-Riter.

The Lettera 22 also features a tabulator setting and clearing system that is controlled from the keyboard, and an innovative margin release that does double duty as a paragraph indentation key (it indents a paragraph when it is held down as the carriage is returned).

Keyboard
For the Italian market the keyboard is in the QZERTY layout, as with most Italian machines (excluding modern computer keyboards).  Aside from the typing keys, the keyboard includes a space bar, two shift keys, one caps lock key, a backspace key and a margin release key. Of these, only the backspace key bears a mark on it (an arrow pointing right), while the other five mentioned are left anonymous.

The character set conspicuously lacks the numbers 0 and 1, which are supposed to be substituted by uppercase "O" and lowercase "l". Although this may seem like a strange absence today, this was actually common on older typewriters.

Also lacking are the keys for uppercase accented vowels, some of which are present in Italian; however, these characters aren't typically found on modern keyboards, either.

The keyboard for the American variant is in the QWERTY layout.  Although the character set lacks the number "1", presumably to be replaced by the lowercase "l", the "0" is present.  One key has the fractions ½ and (shifted) ¼, while another has ¢ (cents) and (shifted) @. A $ is present above the number "4". A British version varies in that it has the "@" placed above the number "4", as well as having the fractions ⅔ and (shifted) ⅓ where the American version has ¢ and (shifted) @.

Layout (Italian Keyboard)

Normal

Shifted

In popular culture
The Olivetti Lettera 22 is mentioned on pg. 15 of Thomas Pynchon's 2009 novel Inherent Vice.

The Olivetti Lettera 22 typewriter was featured in the 1999 film The Talented Mr. Ripley.

The novelist Will Self, poet and singer Leonard Cohen and actor Tom Hanks have expressed use and ownership of this typewriter.

Indro Montanelli, the famous Italian journalist and newspaper director, used his Lettera 22 almost everywhere. A monument in Milan's public gardens Giardini Pubblici Indro Montanelli, 
inspired from a famous photo of Montanelli from the 1950s, is dedicated to him and his Lettera 22.

German writer Günter Grass had three Olivetti Letteras, which he used exclusively at his homes in Portugal, Germany (Schleswig-Holstein) and Denmark.

American writer Joan Didion mentions her Olivetti Lettera 22 in her book Where I Was From, recalling that she typed her 1963 novel Run River on it.

William S. Burroughs replaced his Remington typewriter with a Lettera 22 in 1964.

Austrian composer Olga Neuwirth requested an Olivetti Lettera 22 in her 2018 piece Magic Flu-idity for solo-flute (and typewriter).

Sylvia Plath used an Olivetti Lettera 22 on Cape Cod with Ted Hughes in July, 1957: "They had no phone and no car, just their bicycles, Sylvia's new Olivetti Lettera 22 typewriter (a gift from Aurelia), some books, and clothes" (Clark, Heather. Red Comet: The Short Life and Blazing Art of Sylvia Plath. Vintage Books, New York. 2021).

See also
 Olivetti typewriters (all models)
 Olivetti S.p.A.

References

External links
 Olivetti website

Olivetti typewriters
Articles containing video clips